, also known by the short title , is a Japanese manga series written by Nanki Satō and illustrated by Akira Kiduki. It was serialized in Hakusensha's seinen manga magazine Young Animal from April 2009 to April 2012, with its chapters collected in ten tankōbon volumes (including an extra volume). It was adapted into a live action film, which premiered in September 2013.

Plot
Youkadou, a young salary man, is in love with Seiyuu, an coworker of his. She is in a long-distance relationship with her boyfriend, but she agrees to go out with him on the condition they never have sex.

Characters

Media

Manga
Usotsuki Paradox, written by Nanki Satō and illustrated by Akira Kiduki, was serialized in Hakusensha's seinen manga magazine Young Animal magazine, from April 10, 2009, to April 13, 2012. Hakusensha collected its chapters in nine tankōbon volumes, released under the Jet Comics imprint, between September 29, 2009, and June 26, 2012. A 10th volume with extra chapters, subtitled  was published simultaneously with the 9th.

Live-action film
A live-action film adaptation, directed by Kōta Yoshida, premiered at the Human Trust Cinema in Shibuya on September 7, 2013. The lead characters Shunsuke Yōkadō and Hinako Seiyū are portrayed by Nami Motoyama and Akihiro Mayama respectively.

Reception

See also
Sex Nanka Kyōminai, another manga series by the same authors
Boku wa Ikemen, another manga series by the same authors

References

External links
 
 

Films directed by Kōta Yoshida
Hakusensha franchises
Hakusensha manga
Live-action films based on manga
Manga adapted into films
Romance anime and manga
Seinen manga
Japanese romance films